Zeamordella is a genus of beetles in the family Mordellidae, containing the following species:

Zeamordella caprai Franciscolo, 1993
Zeamordella monacha Broun, 1886

References

Mordellidae